Helenites SC is a U.S. Virgin Islands soccer club based in Grove Place, U.S. Virgin Islands that regularly competes in the U.S. Virgin Islands Championship, and has had success in the tournament. The team competed in the St Croix Soccer League and is one of the most successful clubs in St Croix and in the U.S. Virgin Islands.

Former players  

  Teran John - played for Saint Lucia national team

Honors 
 U.S. Virgin Islands Premier League:
 Winners (5): 2006–07, 2011–12, 2013–14, 2014–15, 2018–19
 Runners-up (5): 1997–98, 1999–00, 2004–05, 2015–16, 2016–17.

 St Croix Soccer League:
 Winners (17): 1997–98, 1999–00, 2000–01, 2001–02, 2002–03, 2003–04, 2004–05, 2005–06, 2006–07, 2007–08, 2008–09, 2010–11, 2011–12, 2013–14, 2014–15, 2015–16, 2016–17.
 Runners-up (2): 2009–10, 2012–13.

References

External links 
Profile at Soccerway.com

Soccer clubs in the United States Virgin Islands
1990 establishments in the United States Virgin Islands
Association football clubs established in 1990